Michael Robert Stone (born June 7, 1990) is a Canadian professional ice hockey defenceman who is currently playing under contract to the Calgary Flames of the National Hockey League (NHL). He was selected by the Phoenix Coyotes in the third round (69th overall) in the 2008 NHL Entry Draft.

He is the older brother of Vegas Golden Knights captain Mark Stone.

Playing career
Stone played two seasons of junior ice hockey with the Calgary Hitmen of the WHL before being selected 69th overall in the 2008 NHL Entry Draft by the Phoenix Coyotes. He played two more seasons of ice hockey with the Hitmen before signing an entry-level contract with the Coyotes.

Stone made his NHL debut on February 18, 2012, recording 11:31 of ice-time in a 2–1 overtime win over the Dallas Stars. He then scored his first NHL goal on March 10, 2012, in a 3–0 win over the San Jose Sharks. Ultimately, Stone scored 1 goal and 2 assists in 13 games during the 2011–12 season.

Stone spent the early part of the 2012–13 season with the Portland Pirates, the Coyotes' AHL affiliate, due to the 2012–13 NHL lockout, but joined the Coyotes again after the lockout ended. He scored 5 goals and 4 assists for 9 points in 40 games. After the season, the Coyotes signed Stone to a three-year, $3.45 million contract extension on July 6, 2013.

After a successful 2015–16 season that saw Stone post a career-high 36 points for the Coyotes, he signed a one-year, $4 million contract extension with the Coyotes, avoiding salary arbitration on July 29, 2016.

On February 20, 2017, Stone was traded to the Calgary Flames in exchange for a 2017 third-round pick and a 2018 conditional fifth-round pick. He recorded six points in 19 games to close out the season.

On June 30, 2017, the Flames re-signed Stone to a three-year, $10.5 million contract extension.

After appearing in just eleven games to start the 2018–19 season, the Flames placed Stone on Injured Reserve with a blood clot on November 22. He made his return to the Flames' lineup on March 16, 2019 in a 2–1 loss to the Winnipeg Jets. However, he served mostly as a healthy scratch following this game, appearing in only two more games and sitting out the entirety of the Flames' postseason games.

On August 2, 2019, the Flames bought out the final year of Stone's contract, making him an unrestricted free agent. On September 11, Stone re-joined the Flames, signing a one-year, $700,000 contract. On January 18, 2021, Stone signed a one-year contract with the Flames.

Prior to the  season, Stone was again re-signed by the Flames as a free agent, agreeing to a one-year, $750,000 contract on September 10, 2021.

Career statistics

Awards and honours

References

External links

1990 births
Living people
Arizona Coyotes draft picks
Arizona Coyotes players
Calgary Flames players
Calgary Hitmen players
Canadian expatriate ice hockey players in the United States
Canadian ice hockey defencemen
Phoenix Coyotes players
Portland Pirates players
San Antonio Rampage players
Stockton Heat players
Ice hockey people from Winnipeg